The Magech River is a river of Ethiopia. Its tributaries include the Dmaza, the Lesser Angereb, and the Ahyamezoriya.

The Magech is known for having two bridges cross it which were built either by Portuguese artisans or during the reign of Fasilides: one of five arches, and another of three arches upstream near Gondar.

On 21 June 2007, the World Bank announced that it had approved an International Development Association credit of US$100 million for an Irrigation and Drainage project covering the Magech and Reb rivers, as part of the Nile Basin Initiative. With the goal of increasing irrigated agricultural output, this proposed project will develop incrementally a total area of 20,000 hectares.

See also 
 List of rivers of Ethiopia

References 

Tributaries of Lake Tana
Rivers of Ethiopia